Jonelle Allen (born July 18, 1944) is an American actress, singer, and dancer from Harlem, New York, United States. Beginning her professional career in the late 1960s, Allen has co-starred in films, Broadway productions, and television. In 1972, Allen was nominated for a Tony Award for Best Actress in a Musical for her performance in the musical Two Gentlemen of Verona.

Biography

Early life, education and career
Born in New York City, Allen was raised in the Sugar Hill section of Harlem. The only child of Marion, a postal worker, and Robert Allen, a NYC transit worker, Allen began performing at the age of four, and attended the Professional Children's School. She made her Broadway debut at the age of six in The Wisteria Trees, Joshua Logan's Americanized adaptation of The Cherry Orchard, starring Helen Hayes. As a child, she also made regular appearances on a local children's television series, The Merry Mailman, hosted by Ray Heatherton.

Career
Allen returned to Broadway in a revival of Finian's Rainbow. She was in the cast of the original off-Broadway 1968 production of Hair at Joseph Papp's Public Theater, and also appeared in George M! before receiving critical acclaim and a Tony Award nomination for Two Gentlemen of Verona, which earned her New York Drama Critics' Circle, Drama Desk, Theatre World, and Outer Critics Circle Awards for her performance. Despite her success, it proved to be her last Broadway appearance to date. 

Allen's film credits include Cotton Comes to Harlem, The Hotel New Hampshire, and The River Niger, for which she won an NAACP Image Award. Other television appearances include Match Game, Barney Miller, The Love Boat, All in the Family, Trapper John, M.D., Hill Street Blues, Cagney and Lacey, ER, and Girlfriends. Allen portrayed a lesbian prison inmate in the 1975 television movie Cage Without a Key, which starred Susan Dey.

Her most notable roles are Grace, the entrepreneurial café owner in the Old West, that she played for seven years on Dr. Quinn, Medicine Woman, as well as the flamboyant and outspoken Doreen Jackson on the NBC soap opera Generations, and Lucinda Cavender, the vampire witch in the horror comedy film The Midnight Hour. Before Generations, she played ambitious salesgirl-turned-boutique-manager Stacey Russell on the short-lived prime-time soap Berrenger's. Allen appeared as legendary Harlem jazz queen Florence Mills in Harlem Renaissance at the 2007 Edinburgh Festival Fringe.

More recently, Allen has headed the New Works/Staged Reading Projects at Saddleback College, and is writing and directing new shows which Allen calls "plays with music", which have been presented at Saddleback, notably an adaptation of Charles Dickens' A Christmas Carol and The Journey, both with composer David Jayden Anthony.

In 2017, Allen appeared in the film The Divorce, released on Amazon, and starred in Hello, Dolly at Saddlebacks CLO. The same year, she starred in Donald B. Welch's Secret Garden, and worked on an updated version of her Florence Mills one-woman show, written with collaborators Stevi Meredith and David Jayden Anthony.

Personal
Allen has been married three times. She was married to John Sharpe on December 19, 1978, divorcing in 1992. Then she was married to Richard Grimmon from January 9, 1998 until 2001. Most recently she was married to Leigh Eaton from 2003 until his death in 2020.

Filmography

References

External links
Fan Site

1944 births
American soap opera actresses
20th-century African-American women singers
African-American female dancers
African-American dancers
Actresses from New York City
People from Harlem
Living people
American female dancers
African-American actresses
American television actresses
American film actresses
American musical theatre actresses
American stage actresses
Dancers from New York (state)
21st-century African-American people
21st-century African-American women